Thomas Washbourne (1606–1687) was an English clergyman and poet, known for his 1654 book Divine Poems. The Poems of Thomas Washbourne, D.D., was published in 1869, edited by Alexander Grosart, and kept Washbourne's name as a religious poet alive.

He was born  at Wichenford Court, in Worcestershire, of the Armigerous Knights Washbourne line, and educated at Balliol College, Oxford. In 1642, he became rector of Dumbleton, while a  prebendary canon of Gloucester Cathedral.

He married Dorothy, daughter of Samuel Fell DD, Dean of Christ Church and sister of John Fell, Bishop of Oxford.

He died on 6 May 1687.

References
 Alexander B. Grosart, The poems of Thomas Washbourne (1868)
Concise Dictionary of National Biography
 The Washbourne Family of Little Washbourne and Wichenford, Methuen, London, Rev. James Davenport

External links
WikiTree

1606 births
1687 deaths
17th-century English Anglican priests
English male poets
People from Malvern Hills District